Robert F. Dorr (September 11, 1939 – June 12, 2016) was an American author and retired senior diplomat who wrote and published over 70 books, hundreds of short stories, and numerous contemporary non-fiction articles on international affairs, military issues, and the Vietnam War. Most recently, he headed the weekly "Back Talk" opinion column for the Military Times newspaper and the monthly "Washington Watch" feature of Aerospace America. He is also on the Masthead as the technical editor of Air Power History,  the journal of the Air Force Historical Foundation, and was Washington correspondent for the discontinued World Air Power Journal. He has appeared as an expert on numerous CNN, History News Network, C-SPAN, and other national and cable television programs.

Early life
Dorr was born in Washington, DC on September 11, 1939, to government workers Blanche Boisvert and Lawrence Gerald Dorr of 2800 - 33rd Street, Washington, DC. In 1947, Dorr moved with his family to the nearby Maryland suburbs where he would graduate from high school. A humorous 2017 article featured on Gizmodo uncovered that at 14 years old, Dorr wrote letters to Boeing and other companies requesting photos of certain planes. As the planes were classified at the time, the FBI opened multiple espionage investigations but ultimately concluded he was a "loyal American boy."

After high school, Dorr joined the U.S. Air Force in 1957, and served in Korea. Upon leaving the Air Force in 1960, Dorr moved to San Francisco to attend the University of California, Berkeley. His writing career in Men's adventure magazines began around this time. In 1964, Dorr became a Foreign Service Officer with the U.S. Department of State, where he was assigned as a US diplomat and political officer to U.S. Embassies and Consulates in Madagascar, South Korea, Japan, Liberia, Sweden, and the United Kingdom. Dorr was fluent in French, Japanese, Korean, Russian, Swedish, and German, and retired as a Senior Foreign Service officer in 1990. He devoted the rest of his life to writing.

Career
Dorr spent 25 years as a Senior Foreign Service Officer (1964–89) with the U.S. State Department. He held senior positions in Washington after tours of duty in Tananarive, Madagascar; Seoul, Korea; Fukuoka, Japan; Monrovia, Liberia; Stockholm, Sweden; and London, England. He married his wife, a South Korean national, in 1968 in a ceremony that was held at the home of his Foreign Service mentor, Ambassador William J. Porter.

Dorr published his first magazine article in 1955 (age 16) and is best known for his magazine and newspaper work. In 1960, fresh out of the Air Force, Dorr moved to San Francisco to attend the University of California, Berkeley, staying at the famed Baker's Acres boarding house for much of the period 1960–1964 with several lifelong friends, including: future Air Force Colonel Larry Harry; future colleague and CIA Officer Dick Ristaino; and others. It was during this time that Dorr began to publish what would become thousands of fictional action stories for numerous men's adventure and pulp magazines, something Dorr continued to do quietly on the side even after his appointment as a Foreign Service Officer in 1964. Dorr's many contributions to this genre were only very recently resurfaced in "A Handful of Hell - Classic War and Adventure Stories by Robert F. Dorr" edited by Robert Deis and Wyatt Doyle (2016), as well as the compendium: "Weasels Ripped My Flesh!" (2012). In 1978, he received a non-fiction award from the now-defunct Aviation/Space Writers Association. He regularly contributed articles to Air Forces Monthly, Air International, Combat Aircraft, Aerospace America magazine, the journal of the American Institute of Aeronautics and Astronautics (AIAA), Air & Space/Smithsonian, and Flight Journal. Dorr was heavily engaged in writing for London-based Aerospace Publishing - initially for its partwork magazines and latterly for its prestigious quarterlies, including World Air Power Journal.

Dorr's weekly opinion column in the trade journal Military Times was read by about 100,000 current, former, and retired military members and their families. Dorr's opinion columns combined strong support for the military with a liberal political point of view. In a September 10, 2007 column that was widely reprinted around the United States, he called for an end to the prison camp at Guantanamo Bay, Cuba, and for treating war prisoners openly under the 1949 Geneva Convention. Before U.S. law changed to permit it, Dorr called for the military to allow homosexuals to serve openly. In other columns, he has urged veterans service organizations to get up to date to attract younger veterans and has written about what he calls the dismantling of the Air Force in an era of tight budgets.

Dorr was an observer of events in North Korea. Service academies, universities, and Veteran's groups have used his speeches and writings on foreign affairs and Air Force history. Dorr has been interviewed on several networks, including C-SPAN, the Discovery Channel, CNN, and local Washington-area newscasts. In 2010, he was given an Achievement Award by the Air Force Historical Foundation for his work for the foundation and its magazine, Air Power History.

Latest projects
Fighting Hitler's Jets was published in 2013 and describes Nazi Germany's introduction of jet and rocket-powered aircraft into the aerial battlefields of World War II. The book also discusses the actions taken by the Allies to counter these advanced aircraft.

Dorr's book Mission to Tokyo about B-29 Superfortress crews in the war against Japan was published September 4, 2012. Focused in part on the firebomb mission to the Japanese capital on the night of March 9–10, 1945, the book is based on interviews with crewmembers. Readers encounter characters as disparate as the gruff, cigar-smoking Gen. Curtis LeMay and the author and artist Yoko Ono. Walter J. Boyne wrote in a review: "Mission to Tokyo is yet another incredible solo example of Bob's prolific scholarship and dedication to the art of writing aviation history."*

Dorr's book Mission to Berlin, about the Eighth Air Force raid of February 3, 1945 over Europe in World War II, was published May 1, 2011. This is primarily a history of B-17 Flying Fortress crews in one of the largest air battles of the war but it also covers Americans who flew and maintained the B-24 Liberator, P-47 Thunderbolt, and P-51 Mustang.

Dorr and former astronaut Tom Jones published in 2008 a wartime history of the 365th Fighter Group, Hell Hawks. This is a history of an aerial band of brothers who went ashore at Normandy just after the June 6, 1944 D-Day invasion, fought on the continent through the Battle of the Bulge, and were still in action when Germany surrendered. These American airmen lived under crude conditions, and were subject to harsh weather and frequent enemy attacks as they moved from one airbase to another, accompanying the Allied advance toward Germany. To tell their story, Dorr and Jones interviewed 183 surviving veterans who supported, maintained, and piloted the group's P-47 Thunderbolt fighters. Hell Hawks is in its ninth printing with almost 30,000 copies in print. Referring to Hell Hawks, Walter J. Boyne, former director of the National Air and Space Museum and member of the National Aviation Hall of Fame, wrote, "Hell Hawks sets a new standard for histories of the tactical air war in Europe. Veteran authors Bob Dorr and Tom Jones combine masterfully crafted veteran interviews with the broader picture of the air war fought by the Thunderbolt men." The Experimental Aircraft Association's Warbirds magazine (July 2008) wrote, "Hell Hawks is a Stephen Ambrose-style history of a 'band of brothers' with airplanes."

Dorr published the science fiction novel Hitler's Time Machine in January 2015. The story concerns competing groups of American and German scientists trying to perfect a working time machine in order to influence the outcome of World War II.

Published books

A partial listing of books Dorr has authored or co-authored include:
A Handful of Hell: Classic War and Adventure Stories by Robert F. Dorr (2016) 
Air Combat: An Oral History of Fighter Pilots (2007) 
Air Force One (2002) 
Air War Hanoi (1988) 
Air War: South Vietnam (1991) 
B-24 Liberator Units of the Eighth Air Force (1999) 
B-24 Liberator Units of the Fifteenth Air Force (2000) 
B-24 Liberator Units of the Pacific War (1999) 
B-29 Superfortress Units of the Korean War (2003) 
B-29 Superfortress Units of World War II (2002) 
B-52 Stratofortress : Boeing's Cold War warrior 
Chopper: A History of America Military Helicopter Operations from WWII to the War on Terror (2005) 
Crime Scene: Fairfax County (2016) 
Desert Shield : the build-up, the complete story (1991) 
Fighting Hitler's Jets (2013) 
 Hell Hawks! The Untold Story of the American Fliers Who Savaged Hitler's Wehrmacht (2008) with Tom Jones. . Zenith Press.
 Hitler's Time Machine (2015)  (novel) 
Korean War Aces (1995) 
 McDonnell Douglas F-4 Phantom II" (1988) Marine Air: The History of the Flying Leathernecks in Words and Photos (2007) Mission to Berlin (2011) Mission to Tokyo (2012) U.S. Marines: The People and Equipment Behind America's First Military Response (2006) Weasels Ripped My Flesh!'' (2012)

External links

Review of Mission to Tokyo by Walter J. Boyne
Air Force Times article "Vietnam era's Dragonfly a ground-support warrior" January 13, 2003
Osprey Publishing, Robert F Dorr

Air Force Times article "Legendary military columnist, author Bob Dorr dies at 76" June 14, 2016

Footnotes

1939 births
2016 deaths
American male non-fiction writers
American military historians
American diplomats
American male journalists
Aviation writers
United States Air Force airmen
United States Department of State officials
University of California, Berkeley alumni
United States Foreign Service personnel